Vitaliy Danilov is the former president of Ukrainian Premier League (2008–2016) and honorary president of FC Kharkiv (2005–2010).

Biography
Vitaliy Danilov was born June 10, 1967 in Ukraine. He graduated from the Kyiv National University with degree in fitness education and sport. He continued graduate studies at Kharkiv Economic University. Danilov is a former member of Ukrainian parliament (Verkhovna Rada).

Political career
In 2007 Ukrainian parliamentary election Danilov was first elected into parliament on the party list of Bloc Yulia Tymoshenko. In 2012 he was re-elected into parliament on the party list of "Fatherland" (number 57 on this list). In the 2014 Ukrainian parliamentary election Danilov was not re-elected into parliament; because he placed 21st on the electoral list of Batkivshchina and the party won 17 seats on the electoral list and 2 constituency seats.

Premier League of Ukraine
Vitaliy Danilov was elected as a temporary acting president on May 27, 2008 when top 16 Ukrainian football clubs declared about Ukrainian Premier League launch.

On July 1, 2009, Danilov won the election and became the league president without 'temporary acting' prefix.

But in July 2009, five Premier League clubs: Arsenal (Kyiv), Dynamo (Kyiv), Dnipro (Dnepropetrovsk), Kryvbas (Kryvy Rig), and Metalist (Kharkov) declared that the elections of the League's president were illegal due to procedure infraction. The representatives of the above-mentioned clubs did not recognize Vitaliy Danilov as the president.

To resolve this conflict Vitaliy Danilov initiated in September 2009 re-election of the League's president and on December 1, 2009, won the election again with 11 clubs voted for his candidature, 3 (Arsenal, Dynamo, Metalist) – against, 1 (Kryvbas) abstain, and 1 (FC Dnipro) – absent. This time most presidents of the Premier League of Ukraine acknowledged Vitaliy Danilov legality.

References

1967 births
Living people
People from Khmelnytskyi Oblast
National University of Ukraine on Physical Education and Sport alumni
Kharkiv National University of Economics alumni
Independent politicians in Ukraine
All-Ukrainian Union "Fatherland" politicians
Sixth convocation members of the Verkhovna Rada
Seventh convocation members of the Verkhovna Rada
Ninth convocation members of the Verkhovna Rada
Ukrainian football chairmen and investors
FC Kharkiv
Ukrainian Premier League presidents
Recipients of the Order of Merit (Ukraine), 3rd class
FC Metalist Kharkiv